K&B (Katz and Besthoff) was a drug store chain headquartered in New Orleans. Founded in 1905, it expanded to have stores in the United States Gulf Coast region until it was purchased by Rite Aid in 1997.

Gustave Katz partnered with Sydney J. Besthoff at 732 Canal Street, New Orleans in 1905, and continually expanded through the 20th century to become a regional chain. It was well known for its unique purple color, with everything in the store (signs, cash registers, employee uniforms, etc.) being "K&B Purple".  This color became well known as a descriptive term in the local lexicon - as one might describe something as "forest green", New Orleanians still describe this particular shade of purple as "K&B purple."

K&B had many of its own private label items, including household goods such as logo ice chests and garbage cans (in purple), its own liquor line with names typically beginning with the letters K&B and the YENDIS (Sidney spelled backwards) Liquor brand, and for a time a brand of beer. While the majority of K&B brand products were inexpensive non-descript products locally regarded as just above a generic brand, the line also included well regarded products such as the much beloved line of K&B ice cream; the distinctive K&B Creole Cream Cheese ice cream and its "talking ice cream freezer display case" TV commercials were local favorites. K&B had its own credit card operation too and since its credit policy was so stringent it became a badge of honor to be awarded a K&B credit card.

K&B's corporate headquarters, K&B Plaza were located at Lee Circle in the New Orleans Central Business District. The building built in the mid 1960s, was originally designed by Skidmore, Owings, & Merrill, and owned and occupied by the John Hancock Insurance Company. Featured on the raised terrazzo plaza that surrounded the building is a large marble column topped with a marble crescent fountain called the "Mississippi Fountain" (see: http://www.noguchi.org/noguchi/works/mississippi-fountain), made by Isamu Noguchi. In the mid-seventies, K&B bought the building from John Hancock. The building is still known as K&B Plaza despite the fact that K&B sold its assets to Rite Aid in 1997, however the K&B family still own and occupy office space there on the seventh (top) floor from which the family, including two of Sydney's daughters, Valerie and Jane, manage their significant real estate business. The building is a showcase for some of Sydney's art collection and is open to the public. The older headquarters and warehouse at 900 Camp Street was donated by K&B to become the headquarters of New Orleans' Contemporary Arts Center at the start of the 1980s.  After Rite Aid's rebranding of the chain, items from the stores were sold to the public with proceeds benefiting local charities.

Sydney Besthoff III, the grandson of the drugstore's founder, and his wife, Walda are well-known local philanthropists and collectors of museum-quality works of art. Their collection includes works by significant contemporary sculptors.  The Sydney and Walda Besthoff Sculpture Garden at the New Orleans Museum of Art in City Park was created from their specifications and donations.

Bibliography 
 K&B: "Only the Best," by John S. Epstein, 2010.  
 K&B Drug Stores, by John S. Epstein, 2011.

External links

Besthoff Sculpture Garden at City Park

Rite Aid
Retail companies established in 1905
Culture of New Orleans
Companies based in New Orleans
Defunct pharmacies of the United States
Retail companies disestablished in 1997
Health care companies based in Louisiana
1905 establishments in Louisiana